Dendrobium findlayanum, Findlay's dendrobium, is a species of orchid. It is native to Indochina (Vietnam, Thailand, Laos, Myanmar) and to the Yunnan region of  China.

The epithet is sometimes spelled findleyanum. The species was named for James Findlay.

The flower colours in the illustration are white and yellow, yet online photographs show white and pink. Clarification needed.

References

findlayanum
Orchids of Asia
Flora of Indo-China
Orchids of Laos
Orchids of Myanmar
Orchids of Thailand
Orchids of Vietnam
Orchids of Yunnan
Plants described in 1874